Neha Ratnakaran  is an Indian actress and model. She participated in Miss Malabar 2013 and was crowned 1st runner up.

She has appeared in Tamil, Malayalam and Telugu films. She made her acting debut in the Tamil film Ivanuku Thannila Gandam (2015).

Early life and education 
Neha Ratnakaran was born and brought up in Kannur, Kerala. She has an elder sister and an elder brother.  She attended K. V. Kannur and K. V. Keltron Nagar thereafter. She started her modelling career while she was in high school. During her stint as a Beauty pageant, she was the 1st runner up in Miss Malabar 2013 competition. Before coming to movies she has done commercials for Colombo umbrella, Atlas Jewellery. She is a B.Com. graduate .

Career
She started her career in 2014 with a Tamil movie, but it was not released. She made her acting debut in the Tamil film, Ivanuku Thannila Gandam (2015).

Filmography

References

1997 births
Living people
Actresses from Kannur
21st-century Indian actresses
Actresses in Tamil cinema
Actresses in Malayalam cinema
Female models from Kerala
Actresses in Telugu cinema